"Envolver" is a song by Brazilian singer Anitta from her fifth studio album Versions of Me. It was released as the fourth single from the album through Warner Records on 11 November 2021. A reggaeton and EDM hybrid song that hints to desiring a sexual relationship in a casual way, the lyrics incorporate several sexual innuendos and double entendres. A remix of the song featuring American singer Justin Quiles was released on 17 February 2022.

The song and its music video, self-directed by Anitta, went viral in March 2022, after it gained popularity on TikTok, where its "booty-grinding" dance became one of the most replicated. "Envolver" broke a string of records, including the first solo Latin song to reach the top of the Spotify Global Daily chart, which earned Anitta an entry in the Guinness Book of World Records.

Commercially, the song achieved international success in Latin America and became Anitta's most charted song to date. With "Envolver", Anitta had her highest entries on the Billboard Global 200 and Billboard Global Excl. U.S., at numbers two and one, respectively. The song also reached number 70 on the Billboard Hot 100 chart issue dated April 16, 2022, becoming Anitta's highest career peak, and peaked at number one in the Billboard Brazil Songs chart.

In August 2022, Rolling Stone named
"Envolver" the 81st best reggaeton song of all time. In the same month, the song won the MTV Video Music Award for Best Latin, making her the first Brazilian to win a category in the awards' history.

Background 
On 8 November 2021, Anitta released a teaser of the song through her social media. On the following days, the single cover art and a small snippet of the music video were also revealed. The self-directed music video of "Envolver" was released along with the song on November 11. It features Anitta dancing sensually with Moroccan dancer and model Ayoub Mutanda.

A remix featuring American singer Justin Quiles was released on February 17, 2022.

Commercial performance 
Following its release, "Envolver" broke a string of records. It became the first Latin solo song to reach the top position of the Spotify Global Daily chart, which earned Anitta an entry in the Guinness Book of World Records. It was noted that other Latin songs that had previously reached the number one position ("Despacito", "Mi Gente", "Dákiti", "Havana" and "Señorita") were all collaborations between two or more artists.

"Envolver" also became the most streamed song in a single-day in Spotify in 2022 (7.278 million streams) at the time, biggest streaming day for a female Latin song, as well as the first song by a Brazilian artist to reach the top of the Spotify Global Daily chart. Additionally it also became the first song ever to place inside the top 50 of all Latin countries on Spotify. It also broke the record for most one-day streams in Brazil with over 4.5 million plays, a record that was previously held by herself with "Vai Malandra" (2.1 million streams).

Commercially, the song achieved international success and became Anitta's most charted song to date. "Envolver" became Anitta's highest entries on the Billboard Global 200 and Billboard Global Excl. U.S., at numbers two and one, respectively. The song also reached number 70 on the Billboard Hot 100 chart issue dated 16 April 2022, becoming Anitta's second entry overall on the chart, first entry as a soloist and her highest career peak at the time.

"Envolver" also peaked at number one in the Billboard Brazil Songs chart, and number six on Billboards Hot Latin Songs chart. The song has also peaked within the top ten in the charts of several countries, such as Bolivia, Chile, Colombia, Ecuador, Dominican Republic, Honduras, Mexico, Paraguay, Panama, Peru, Portugal and Puerto Rico, and debuted in the charts of twenty others, including Argentina, Canada, El Salvador, France, Greece, Ireland, Luxembourg, Netherlands, Italy, Spain and Switzerland.

Live performances and Accolades 
Anitta first performed the song on her Carnatal show on 12 December 2021. The song was performed multiple other times after that, including Miley's New Year's Eve Party on 1 January 2022. On 24 February 2022, Anitta performed the remix version of "Envolver" with Justin Quiles for the first time on Premio Lo Nuestro 2022. On 25 June 2022, Anitta performed the song for the first time on the French television show Quotidien. On 28 August 2022, Anitta performed the song at the 2022 MTV Video Music Awards. On 9 November 2022, Anitta performed at the Rihanna fashion show, Savage x Fenty Show Vol.4 was released on Amazon Prime Video. On 17 November 2022, Anitta performed "Envolver" at the Latin Grammy Awards. On 20 November 2022, she made another performance at the American Music Awards.

World Records

Charts

Weekly charts

Monthly charts

Year-end charts

Certifications

Release history

Notes

References 

2021 singles
2021 songs
Anitta (singer) songs
Justin Quiles songs
Warner Records singles
Songs written by Anitta (singer)
Billboard Global Excl. U.S. number-one singles